Events in the year 1846 in Mexico.

Incumbents 
 President – Mariano Paredes
 President – José Mariano Salas
 President – Valentín Gómez Farías

Governors
 Aguascalientes: Felipe Nieto y del Portillo/Felipe Cosio
 Chiapas: Jerónimo Cardona
 Chihuahua: 
 Coahuila: Rafael Vázquez/José María de Aguirre González/Santiago Rodríguez del Bosquea
 Durango:  
 Guanajuato: 
 Guerrero: 
 Jalisco: Antonio Escobedo/Juan Nepomuceno Cumplido/José María Yáñez/Joaquín Angulo
 State of Mexico:  
 Michoacán: 
 Nuevo León: 
 Oaxaca: 
 Puebla: 
 Querétaro: Julián Juvera
 San Luis Potosí: 
 Sinaloa: 
 Sonora: 
 Tabasco: 
 Tamaulipas: Juan Martin de la Garza Flores/Manuel Núñez Ponce/Manuel Saldaña/Francisco Vital Fernandez	 
 Veracruz: Manuel Gutiérrez Zamora/José de Emparán/Manuel Gutiérrez Zamora
 Yucatán: 
 Zacatecas:

Events 

 April 25 – Mexican–American War: Open conflict begins over border disputes of Texas' boundaries.
 May 8 – Mexican–American War – Battle of Palo Alto: Zachary Taylor defeats a Mexican force north of the Rio Grande at Palo Alto, Texas in the first major battle of the war.
 May 9 – Mexican–American War – Battle of Resaca de la Palma in Brownsville, Texas
 May 13 – Mexican–American War: The United States declares war on Mexico.

 June 10 – Mexican–American War: The California Republic declares independence from Mexico.
 June 14 – Bear Flag Revolt: American settlers in Sonoma, California start a rebellion against Mexico and proclaim the California Republic.
 July 7 – Acting on instructions from Washington, DC, Commodore
 August 6 – José Mariano Salas assumed the presidency as provisional president.
 August 22 – President José Mariano Salas decreed the Mexican Constitution of 1824 in effect again.
 September 21-24 – Battle of Monterrey

Notable births

References

 
Years of the 19th century in Mexico